Heston Sawyer Kjerstad (born February 12, 1999) is an American professional baseball outfielder in the Baltimore Orioles organization. Kjerstad was selected second overall by the Orioles in the 2020 Major League Baseball draft.

Amateur career
Kjerstad grew up in Amarillo, Texas and attended Randall High School. As a junior, he batted .477 with 32 RBIs and was named the District 3-5A Most Valuable Player and first team All-State. Kjerstad was named first team All-State and District 3-5A Most Valuable Player again as a senior. He was drafted in the 36th round of the 2017 Major League Baseball Draft by the Seattle Mariners, but opted to play college baseball at Arkansas instead.

Kjerstad was a starting outfielder for the Razorbacks as a true freshman. He batted .332 with 30 extra base hits, 14 home runs, 58 RBIs and was named the Southeastern Conference (SEC) Freshman of the Year, second team All-SEC and a freshman All-American by the National Collegiate Baseball Writers Association and the Collegiate Baseball Newspaper. He helped the team to the 2018 College World Series final and was named to the All-Tournament team. As a sophomore, Kjerstad was again named second team All-SEC after batting .327 with 17 home runs and 51 RBI's. During the summer, he played for the Team USA Collegiate National Baseball Team and batted .395 in 14 games.

Kjerstad entered his junior season as a preseason first team All-American selection by Perfect Game and by Collegiate Baseball Newspaper and as a top prospect for the 2020 Major League Baseball Draft. He was named the SEC Player of the Week as well as the National Player of the Week by Collegiate Baseball for the first week of the season after going 7 for 13 with four home runs, 10 RBIs and six runs scored in the Razorbacks opening series against Eastern Illinois. Kjerstad batted .448 with six home runs, 20 RBI's and 19 runs scored in 16 games before the season was cut short due to the coronavirus pandemic.

Professional career
Kjerstad was selected by the Baltimore Orioles with the second overall pick in the 2020 Major League Baseball draft. Kjerstad signed with the Orioles on June 30, 2020 for a $5.2 million bonus. Kjerstad developed myocarditis after signing and missed spring training and all of the 2021 season.

Kjerstad made his professional debut on June 10, 2022, for the Class-A Delmarva Shorebirds. In early July, he was promoted to the High-A Aberdeen IronBirds.

He played in the 2022 Arizona Fall League, where he batted .371/.400/.663, and led the league in at bats (89) and doubles (9), as he was second in strikeouts (27).

References

External links

Arkansas Razorbacks bio

1999 births
Living people
Arkansas Razorbacks baseball players
Baseball outfielders
Baseball players from Texas
Sportspeople from Amarillo, Texas
United States national baseball team players
Delmarva Shorebirds players
Aberdeen IronBirds players